The Fargo-Moorhead Twins were a minor league baseball team that existed from 1933 to 1942 and from 1946 to 1960, representing the neighboring cities of Fargo, North Dakota and Moorhead, Minnesota. The Twins won six league championships during their seasons of play. Earlier minor league teams had also represented the cities. Baseball Hall of Fame members Dizzy Dean (1941) and Lloyd Waner (1947) are Fargo-Moorhead Twins alumni, as is 2x AL Most Valuable Player Roger Maris.

History
The Fargo-Moorhead Twins played in the Northern League from 1933–1942 and 1946–1960. The Twins were an affiliate of the Cleveland Indians (1934–1940, 1953–1957), Pittsburgh Pirates (1947–1948) and New York Yankees (1958–1960).

The preceding Fargo-Moorhead area teams were the 1897 Red River Valley League members Fargo Red Stockings and Moorhead Barmaids, who were the first area minor league franchises. Fargo (1902–1905), the Fargo Browns (1908) and Fargo-Moorehead Graingrowers (1914–1917) all played as members of the Northern League and the 1922 Fargo Athletics played in the 1922 Dakota League.

On May 6, 1953, the Fargo-Moorhead Twins defeated Sioux Falls in their Opening Day game by a score of 12-3. A record crowd of 10,123 fans came to Barnett Field. In the game, Roger Maris got his first professional baseball hit. That season, Twins player Frank Gravino would hit 52 home runs. The Twins would host the Northern League All-Star game and defeat the Northern League All-Stars by a score of 8-4. The Twins finished with a record of 86-39 (improving from their record of 44-80 in 1952) and bested Duluth to win the Northern League championship. Roger Maris would be selected as the 1953 Northern League Rookie of the Year.

Fargo-Moorhead won Northern League Championships in 1915, 1917, 1934, 1953, 1954, 1958, claiming six overall titles.

Ballparks

From 1936-1960, the Fargo-Moorhead Twins played their home games at Barnett Field in Fargo, North Dakota. It was located at 19th Avenue and Broadway and was torn down in 1963 to build North High School. 

Prior to Barnett Field, in 1933–1935, Fargo-Moorhead played home games at Moorhead Ballpark in Moorhead, Minnesota.

Notable alumni

Baseball Hall of Fame alumni

 Dizzy Dean (1941) Inducted, 1953
 Lloyd Waner (1947, MGR) Inducted, 1967

Notable alumni

 Horace Clarke (1960)
 Mudcat Grant (1954) 2x MLB All-Star
 Steve Gromek (1940) MLB All-Star
 Danny Litwhiler (1952) MLB All-Star
 Ray Mack (1938) MLB All-Star
 Roger Maris (1953) 7x MLB All-Star; 2x AL Most Valuable Player (1960-1961)
 Pete Mikkelsen (1960)
 Joe Pepitone (1959) 3x MLB All-Star
 Jim Perry (1957) 3x MLB All-Star; 1970 AL Cy Young Award
 Dick Stigman (1954) 2x MLB All-Star
 Ron Taylor (1957)
 Ben Tincup (1942)
 Bob Unglaub (1914-1916)
 Bill Zuber (1934)

Year-by-year records

References

Baseball teams established in 1933
Defunct minor league baseball teams
Baseball teams disestablished in 1960
Pittsburgh Pirates minor league affiliates
New York Yankees minor league affiliates
Cleveland Guardians minor league affiliates
Northern League (1902-71) baseball teams
Professional baseball teams in North Dakota
Sports in Fargo, North Dakota
1933 establishments in Minnesota
1960 disestablishments in North Dakota
Moorhead, Minnesota
Professional baseball teams in Minnesota
Defunct baseball teams in Minnesota
Defunct baseball teams in North Dakota